Rod Rondeaux is a Native American actor and  stuntman. As an actor his work includes the 2005 miniseries, Into the West, Comanche Moon in 2008, The Cayuse  in the 2010 film,  Meek's Cutoff and the lead role in the 2015 film, Mekko. His stunt work includes Reel Injun and Comanche Moon.

Background
For years, Rondeaux was on the rodeo circuit as a horse rider, bull rider, steer wrestler and team roper. His entry into film stunt work was accidental. The film he was asked to be the double in was Crazy Horse. It was for actor Michael Greyeyes.

In 2001, he received the outstanding achievement in stunts award from the First Americans in the Arts.

Rondeaux won two awards for his role in the 2015 film, Mekko. He won the best actor award at the 40th Annual American Indian Film Festival and at the 2015 Red Nation Film Festival.

Career
Rondeaux's earliest role was as Tall Bull in the 1996 film Crazy Horse, which was directed by John Irvin.  
For his role in Meek's Cutoff, as a mysterious and suddenly appearing Native American who joins a lost wagon train on the Oregon Trail, the language he spoke was his own native tongue. 

Rondeaux had his first lead role in the 2015 film, ''Mekko. He played a man who served 19 years incarcerated for murder. Upon his release he discovers his family doesn’t want to have anything to do with him. He has to come to terms with his current situation. In addition, he also has to deal with a violent man (played by Zahn McClarnon). Director Sterlin Harjo actually cast Rondeaux the night before the shooting began. Having talked to the actor a couple of times, Harjo had a good feeling about him. With Rondeaux's background as a rodeo bull rider and Hollywood stuntman, he felt he had the right life experience for the role.  Film critic Dennis Harvey of Variety complimented Rod Rondeaux's "soulful performance", and made comparisons the film to two classic films set on skid row, On the Bowery (1956) and The Exiles (1961).

Rondeaux played Raymond in Babak Jalali's 2018 film, Land. Also in 2018, he was in Susanna White's Woman Walks Ahead.

Filmography (actor)

References

External links
 Imdb: Rod Rondeaux
 Teddy O'Toole's: Stuntman from Montana: The Rod Rondeaux Story

1958 births
American male television actors
Living people
20th-century American male actors
21st-century American male actors
American male film actors
Native American male actors
People from Los Angeles